Crescenzo D'Amore (born April 2, 1979) is an Italian former road cyclist.

Major results

1997
1st  Road race, UCI Junior Road World Championships
2000
1st Stage 3 Vuelta a la Argentina
3rd Poreč Trophy
7th G.P. Costa degli Etruschi
8th Giro di Campania
2004
1st Stage 3 Settimana internazionale di Coppi e Bartali
3rd G.P. Costa degli Etruschi
5th GP de la Ville de Rennes
2005
8th G.P. Costa degli Etruschi
2006
7th Coppa Bernocchi
2007
6th G.P. Costa degli Etruschi

References

1979 births
Living people
Sportspeople from Naples
Italian male cyclists
Cyclists from Campania